Jordi Carrera (born 12 June 1982) is a Spanish field hockey player. He competed for the Spain men's national field hockey team at the 2016 Summer Olympics.

References

1982 births
Living people
Spanish male field hockey players
Olympic field hockey players of Spain
Field hockey players at the 2016 Summer Olympics
Atlètic Terrassa players